Emet is a town and a district of Kütahya Province in the Aegean region of Turkey.

Emet mine, a large boron mine, is located a few miles north of the city. The mine is owned by Eti Boron Inc. (a.ş)

References

 
Populated places in Kütahya Province
Districts of Kütahya Province